Irianto is a surname. Notable people with the surname include:

Eri Irianto (1974–2000), Indonesian footballer
Rachmat Irianto (born 1999), Indonesian footballer